Daqiao is a town in Dingyuan County, Chuzhou, Anhui province, China. , it has 1 residential community and 6 villages under its administration.

See also 
 List of township-level divisions of Anhui

References 

Township-level divisions of Anhui
Dingyuan County